The County of Evelyn is one of the 37 counties of Victoria which are part of the cadastral divisions of Australia, used for land titles. It is located to the east of Melbourne, on both sides of the upper reaches of the Yarra River in the Yarra Valley. The Great Dividing Range is the boundary to the north. The county was proclaimed in 1849, and is named after John Evelyn, a famous diarist and gardener.

Parishes 
Parishes include:
 Beenak, Victoria
 Brimbonga, Victoria
 Burgoyne, Victoria
 Coornburt, Victoria
 Galbarmuck, Victoria
 Glenwatts, Victoria
 Gracedale, Victoria
 Greensborough, Victoria
 Gruyere, Victoria
 Kinglake, Victoria
 Linton, Victoria
 Manango, Victoria
 Monbulk, Victoria
 Monda, Victoria
 Mooroolbark, Victoria
 Nangana, Victoria
 Nillumbik, Victoria
 Parbine, Victoria
 Queenstown, Victoria
 Sutton, Victoria
 Tarrawarra, Victoria
 Tarrawarra North, Victoria
 Wandin Yallock, Victoria
 Warburton, Victoria
 Warrandyte, Victoria
 Woori Yallock, Victoria
 Yering, Victoria
 Yuonga, Victoria

References

See also
Vicnames, place name details
Research aids, Victoria 1910
 Map of the counties of Evelyn, Tanjil, Buln-Buln 1886, National Library of Australia

Counties of Victoria (Australia)